The 2008 ASA Kwik-Trip Midwest Tour presented by Echo Outdoor Power Equipment was the second season of the American Speed Association's Midwest Tour.  The championship was held over 14 races, beginning April 19 in Elko, Minnesota, and ending October 5 in West Salem, Wisconsin.  Dan Fredrickson was the champion.

Schedule and results

Championship points

References

Asa Midwest Tour
ASA Midwest Tour seasons